Going to Extremes is an American drama television series created by Joshua Brand, John Falsey and Frank South. The series stars Erika Alexander, June Chadwick, Roy Dotrice, Camilo Gallardo, Joanna Going, Daniel Jenkins, Charles Keating, Andrew Lauer, Carl Lumbly and Robert Duncan McNeill. The series aired on ABC from September 1, 1992, to January 27, 1993.

Cast 
Erika Alexander as Cheryl Carter
June Chadwick as Dr. Alice Davis
Roy Dotrice as Doctor Croft
Camilo Gallardo as Kim Selby
Joanna Going as Kathleen McDermott
Daniel Jenkins as Alex Loren
Charles Keating as Dr. Jack Van De Weghe
Andrew Lauer as Charlie Moran
Carl Lumbly as Dr. Norris
Robert Duncan McNeill as Colin Midford

Episodes

References

External links
 

1990s American drama television series
1990s American medical television series
1992 American television series debuts
1993 American television series endings
American Broadcasting Company original programming
English-language television shows
Television series by Warner Bros. Television Studios
Television shows set on islands
Television shows set in Hawaii